Michenia is an extinct genus of camelid endemic to North America. Fossil have been found from California to Texas, Alberta, Idaho and Nebraska.

Species
M. agatensis Frick & Taylor 1971
M. deschutensis Dingus 1990
M. exilis Matthew & Macdonald 1960
M. mudhillsnsis Pagnac 2005

References

Prehistoric camelids
Prehistoric even-toed ungulate genera
Oligocene even-toed ungulates
Pliocene even-toed ungulates
Miocene even-toed ungulates
Zanclean extinctions
Prehistoric mammals of North America
Fossil taxa described in 1971